Anedjib, more correctly Adjib and also known as Hor-Anedjib, Hor-Adjib and Enezib, is the Horus name of an early Egyptian king who ruled during the 1st Dynasty. The Egyptian historian Manetho named him "Miebîdós" and credited him with a reign of 26 years, whilst the Royal Canon of Turin credited him with an implausible reign of 74 years. Egyptologists and historians now consider both records to be exaggerations and generally credit Adjib with a reign of 8–10 years.

Name sources

Adjib is well attested in archaeological records. His name appears in inscriptions on vessels made of schist, alabaster, breccia and marble. His name is also preserved on ivory tags and earthen jar seals. Objects bearing Adjib's name and titles come from Abydos and Sakkara.

Identity

Adjib's family has only partially been investigated. His parents are unknown, but it is thought that his predecessor, king Den, may have been his father. Adjib was possibly married to a woman named Betrest. On the Palermo Stone she is described as the mother of Adjib's successor, king Semerkhet. Definite evidence for that view has not yet been found. It would be expected that Adjib had sons and daughters, but their names have not been preserved in the historical record. A candidate for being a possible member of his family line is Semerkhet.

Reign
According to archaeological records, Adjib introduced a new royal title which he thought to use as some kind of complement to the Nisut-Bity-title: the  Nebuy-title, written with the doubled sign of a falcon on a short standard. It means "The two lords" and refers to the divine state patrons Horus and Seth. It also symbolically points to Lower- and Upper Egypt. Adjib is thought to have legitimised his role as Egyptian king with the use of this title.

Clay seal impressions record the foundation of the new royal fortress Hor nebw-khet ("Horus, the gold of the divine community") and the royal residence Hor seba-khet ("Horus, the star of the divine community"). Stone vessel inscriptions show that during Adjib's reign an unusually large number of cult statues were made for the king. At least six objects show the depicting of standing statues representing the king with his royal insignia.

Stone vessel inscriptions record that Adjib commemorated a first and even a second Heb Sed (a throne jubilee), a feast that was celebrated the first time after 30 years of a king's reign, after which it was repeated every third or fourth year. But recent investigations suggest that every object showing the Hebsed and Adjib's name together were removed from king Den's tomb. It would seem that Adjib had simply erased and replaced Den's name with his own. This is seen by egyptologists and historians as evidence that Adjib never celebrated a Hebsed and thus his reign was relatively short. Egyptologists such as Nicolas Grimal and Wolfgang Helck assume that Adjib, as Den's son and rightful heir to the throne, may have been quite old when he ascended the Egyptian throne. Helck additionally points to an unusual feature; All Hebsed pictures of Adjib show the notation Qesen ("calamity") written on the stairways of the Hebsed pavilion. Possibly the end of Adjib's reign was a violent one.

Tomb

Adjib's burial site was excavated at Abydos and is known as "Tomb X". It measures 16.4 x 9.0 metres and is the smallest of all royal tombs in this area. Adjib's tomb has its entrance at the eastern side and a staircase leads down inside. The burial chamber is surrounded by 64 subsidiary tombs and simply divided by a cut-off wall into two rooms. Until the end of the 1st dynasty, it would seem to have been a tradition that the family and court of the king committed suicide (or were killed) and were then buried alongside the ruler in his necropolis.

Finds associated to Anedjib

References

External links
 Francesco Raffaele: Adjib - Merbiape

30th-century BC Pharaohs
Pharaohs of the First Dynasty of Egypt